The MTV Video Music Award for Best Post-Modern Video was first given out in 1989, and it was one of the four original genre categories added to the VMAs that year. The award was last presented in 1990 and the category was renamed Best Alternative Video the following year.

Recipients

MTV Video Music Awards
Awards established in 1989
Awards disestablished in 1990